Sutton is a town in southwestern Quebec. It is part of the Brome-Missisquoi Regional County Municipality in the administrative region of the Estrie. The population as of the Canada 2021 Census was 4,548. Historically, Sutton is considered to be part of the Eastern Townships.

History
Like many other towns and villages in the Eastern Townships, Sutton became home to many United Empire Loyalists, following the American Revolution. In 1799 the first recorded Loyalists immigrated to the area, among them Richard Shepherd, originally of New Hampshire. During the 19th century, new buildings were erected to serve the town's growing population, among them a school in 1808 (on the road linking the town to nearby Abercorn) as well as the town hall built in 1859. In the decades that followed, Protestant and Roman Catholic churches were built as was a railway station.

Sutton became a municipality in 1892, and later a town in 1962. In 2002, the township of Sutton merged with the town of Sutton, roughly doubling the town's population, and vastly expanding the town's area.
The economy has moved from one largely based on farming to one that is heavily reliant on tourism due to the opening of Sutton Ski Resort in 1960.  Sutton is now a popular year-round destination for road and mountain biking, hiking, visits to vineyards and micro-breweries.

Geography

The municipality is bordered to the west by the Réserve Naturelle Montagnes Vertes which can be accessed by footpath provided by three separate organizations: Les sentiers du Corridor appalachien (Mont Singer to Mansonville), Les sentiers du Parc d'environnement naturel de Sutton (Round Top sector), Les sentiers de l’Estrie (Mont Echo sector or Bolton-Est to Mont Glen and Mont Singer). All three have an entry fee or membership obligation that can be easily avoided by simply walking by the payment station.

Demographics 

According to 2021 Census data, Sutton has one of the highest median ages in Canada, at 60.4 years. A sizable percentage of the town's population is composed of artists, the highest proportion in Canada.

Like many other communities in the southwestern quadrant of the province, Sutton has historically been an anglophone enclave in a predominantly francophone province. Today anglophones make up only 24% of the population, compared to 69% for francophones and 5% for allophones.

Due to a large Swiss population in the town, Sutton has many people who speak German. Every year Swiss National Day is celebrated at Mont Sutton ski resort on the last Saturday in July.

See also
Brome-Missisquoi Regional County Municipality
Sutton River, a river of Quebec and Vermont
List of cities in Quebec
Municipal history of Quebec

References

External links
Sutton municipality

Cities and towns in Quebec
Incorporated places in Brome-Missisquoi Regional County Municipality
Designated places in Quebec